Charles C. Droz (born July 8, 1924) is an American former politician in the state of South Dakota. He was a member of the South Dakota House of Representatives. He is an alumnus of South Dakota State University and a veteran of World War II serving with the United States Army. Droz was a farmer and rancher. He was married to Fern Elizabeth Matre, who died in December 2020 at the age of 92.

References

1924 births
Living people
Farmers from South Dakota
Military personnel from South Dakota
People from Miller, South Dakota
Ranchers from South Dakota
Republican Party members of the South Dakota House of Representatives
Speakers of the South Dakota House of Representatives
United States Army personnel of World War II